Lowell Lindsay Bennion (July 26, 1908 – February 21, 1996) was an American educator, sociologist, and humanitarian.  He wrote extensively on religious living in the Church of Jesus Christ of Latter-day Saints (LDS Church), and was an advocate for volunteer service in Utah and Idaho.

Biography
Bennion was born in Salt Lake City, Utah, the son of Milton Bennion and Cora Lindsay Bennion.  In 1928, Bennion graduated from the University of Utah, married Merle Colton and then left to serve in the Swiss–German Mission of the LDS Church.  Bennion spent much of his mission in Zürich, where he served as branch president.  After serving two and a half years as a missionary Bennion began studies towards his Ph.D. at the University of Strasbourg.  His wife came to France to live with him at about this point.

After earning his Ph.D. in sociology in 1933, Bennion returned to Utah and founded the Institute of Religion adjacent to the University of Utah in 1934.  Bennion later founded the Teton Boys Ranch and served as its director for many years.  He served as a bishop in the LDS Church. The first food bank and homeless shelters in Utah were founded by Bennion.

Publications
 
 
 
 
   Expanded from his 1953 Sunday School manual.
 
 
 
 
 
 
 {{cite book
 | author-first   = Bennion
 | author-last    = Lowell L.
 | author-mask    = 2
 | title          = I Believe
 | publisher      = Deseret Book Company
 | location       = Salt Lake City
 | year           = 1983
 | isbn  = 0-87747-954-2
 {{cite book
 | author-first   = Bennion
 | author-last    = Lowell L.
 | author-mask    = 2
 | title          = Do Justly and Love Mercy--Moral Issues for Mormons
 | publisher      = Canon Press
 | location       = Centerville, Utah
 | year           = 1988
 | isbn           = 0-939651-01-7

References

Sources

External links
 Lowell Bennion Community Service Center (University of Utah)
 Inventory of the Lowell Lindsay Bennion papers (housed at University of Utah Library)

1908 births
1996 deaths
20th-century Mormon missionaries
20th-century American educators
American humanitarians
American Latter Day Saint writers
American leaders of the Church of Jesus Christ of Latter-day Saints
American Mormon missionaries in Germany
American Mormon missionaries in Switzerland
American sociologists
Church Educational System instructors
Mormon studies scholars
Sociologists of religion
Sociology educators
University of Strasbourg alumni
University of Utah alumni
University of Utah faculty
Writers from Salt Lake City